Joseph Tapine pronounced (born 4 May 1994) is a New Zealand professional rugby league footballer who plays as a  and  for the Canberra Raiders in the NRL, and for New Zealand and the New Zealand Māori at international level.

Tapine previously played for the Newcastle Knights in the National Rugby League.

Background
Tapine was born in Wellington, New Zealand and is of Māori descent.

Tapine played his junior rugby league for the Harbour City Eagles. He then joined the Wellington Orcas in the New Zealand Rugby League National Competition.

Playing career

Early career
In 2013, Tapine joined the Newcastle Knights on a 1-year contract before re-signing for a further 3 years during the year. He played for the Knights' NYC team in 2013 and 2014. 
On 13 October 2013, Tapine played for the Junior Kiwis against the Junior Kangaroos, starting at second-row in the 38-26 loss at WIN Stadium.

2014
In Round 9 of the 2014 NRL season, Tapine made his NRL debut for the Newcastle Knights against the Penrith Panthers, playing off the interchange bench in the 32-10 loss at Hunter Stadium. Tapine finished off his debut year in the NRL with him playing in 7 matches for the Knights. On 2 September 2014, Tapine was named on the interchange bench in the 2014 NYC Team of the Year. On 18 October 2014, Tapine again played for the Junior Kiwis against the Junior Kangaroos, starting at second-row in the 15-14 win at Mt Smart Stadium. On 24 November 2014, Tapine was charged with occasioning grievous bodily harm following an incident in September 2014 which left another man with a broken jaw.

2015
On 23 June 2015, Tapine had assault charges dropped after a magistrate found prosecutors could not prove he was not acting in self-defence. In Round 22 against the Sydney Roosters, Tapine scored his first NRL career try in the 38-22 loss at Hunter Stadium. Tapine improved on his previous season, playing in 13 matches and scoring 1 try in the 2015 NRL season. 
On 27 September 2015, Tapine played in the Knights' 2015 New South Wales Cup Grand Final against the Wyong Roos in the 20-10 victory at Parramatta Stadium.

2016
On 11 February 2016, Tapine signed a 3-year contract with the Canberra Raiders starting in 2017. After facing spending the year being banished from the Knights first grade squad to waste away in the NSW Cup, however, on 23 February 2017, the Knights agreed to release him from the remainder of his contract, freeing him to join the Raiders immediately. In Round 3, Tapine made his club debut for the Canberra Raiders against the Newcastle Knights, playing off the interchange bench in the 24-24 all draw. In Round 12 against the Canterbury-Bankstown Bulldogs, Tapine scored his first and second club tries for the Raiders in the 32-20 win at Canberra Stadium. Tapine finished the 2016 NRL season with him playing in 25 matches and scoring 4 tries in his first year with the Canberra Raiders. On 4 October 2016, Tapine was selected in the New Zealand Kiwis 24-man squad for the 2016 Four Nations. On 11 November 2016, Tapine made his international debut for the New Zealand Kiwis against Scotland, playing off the interchange bench in the shock 18-18 all draw at Derwent Park. Tapine played in 2 matches in the tournament including playing in the 2016 Four Nations Final match against Australia, off the interchange bench in the 34-8 loss at Anfield.

2017
Tapine finished the 2017 NRL season with him playing in 22 matches and scoring 3 tries for the Raiders.  Tapine was named in the New Zealand Kiwis 24-man squad for the 2017 Rugby League World Cup. On 4 November, he scored his first international try for New Zealand against Scotland in the 74-6 smashing win at Christchurch Stadium. Tapine played in all 4 matches and scored 1 try in the Kiwis shock disappointing campaign.

2018
On 24 June 2018, Tapine played for New Zealand against England in the historical test match set in Denver, USA, starting at second-row in the 36-18 loss at Mile High Stadium. Tapine played in 16 matches and scored 6 tries for the Raiders in the 2018 NRL season. After being sidelined at the end of the year due to a broken thumb on 1 October 2018, Tapine was selected in the Kiwis 23-man squad for their tour of England and the test match against Australia. Tapine played in 2 matches of the Baskerville Shield matches against England. On 24 October 2018, Tapine extended his contract with the Raiders for another 4-years, to the end of the 2023 season.

2019
On 15 February, Tapine represented the Maori All Stars against the Indigenous All Stars in the 2019 All Stars match, playing off the interchange bench in the 34-14 loss at AAMI Park.

Tapine made a total of 17 appearances for Canberra as the club reached the grand final for the first time in 25 years.  Tapine played at lock in the 2019 NRL Grand Final as Canberra were defeated by the Sydney Roosters at ANZ Stadium.

2020
Tapine played 21 games and scored 4 tries in the 2020 NRL season.  He played in all three of Canberra's finals games including the preliminary final loss against Melbourne.

2021
Tapine made a total of 19 appearances for Canberra in the 2021 NRL season.  The club would finish the year in 10th place on the table and miss out on the finals.

2022
Tapine played a total of 25 matches for Canberra in the 2022 NRL season as the club finished 8th on the table and qualified for the finals.  Tapine played in both finals matches as Canberra were eliminated in the second week by Parramatta.

References

External links

Canberra Raiders profile
Raiders profile
NRL profile
2017 RLWC profile

1994 births
Living people
New Zealand rugby league players
New Zealand Māori rugby league players
New Zealand Māori rugby league team players
New Zealand national rugby league team players
Newcastle Knights players
Canberra Raiders players
Junior Kiwis players
Mount Pritchard Mounties players
Rugby league second-rows
Rugby league locks
Rugby league players from Wellington City
Wellington rugby league team players